The 1980–81 European Cup was the 16th edition of the European Cup, IIHF's premier European club ice hockey tournament. The season started on October 9, 1980, and finished on August 9, 1981.

The tournament was won by CSKA Moscow, who won the final group.

First round

  
 EHC Arosa,  
 HK Olimpija Ljubljana,   
 Mannheimer ERC   :  bye

Second round

 HIFK,   
 Brynäs IF,  
 Poldi Kladno,  
 CSKA Moscow    :  bye

Third round

Final Group
(Urtijëi, Italy)

Final group standings

References
 Season 1981

1980–81 in European ice hockey
IIHF European Cup